Jeff Austin (1974–2019) was an American musician.

Jeff(ery) or Geoff(rey) Austin may also refer to:

Jeff Austin (baseball) (born 1976), American Major League Baseball pitcher
Jeff Austin (tennis) (born 1951), American former tennis player
Geoffrey Austin (1837–1902), English Army officer and cricketer
Jeffery Austin (born 1991), American musician

See also
Geoff Austen (born 1953), Australian rules footballer